Fire is an Australian television series transmitted on the Seven Network between 1995 and 1996. It was shown in the UK and Ireland on Sky One. In 1999 and 2000, the series was shown on Channel 5.

The series explored the lives of a platoon of firefighters. The leading cast members included: Andy Anderson, Georgie Parker, Peter Phelps, Shane Connor, Deborra-Lee Furness, Danny Adcock, Wayne Pygram, Tottie Goldsmith, Liddy Clark, Aaron Jeffery, Tayler Kane and Max Phipps.

Cast
Season One:
Firefighter 4th grade Morgan "Mad Dog" Cartwright ~ Georgie Parker
Station Officer Nick "The Boss" Connor ~ Peter Phelps
Senior Station Officer Quentin "Spit" Jacobsen ~ Wayne Pygram
Firefighter 1st grade John "Repo" Kennedy ~ Andy Anderson
Firefighter 1st/3rd grade Louis "Grievous" Fazio ~ Tayler Kane
Firefighter 1st grade David "Giraffe" Simpson ~ Shane Feeney-Connor
Firefighter 1st grade Richard "Banjo" Gates ~ Aaron Jeffery
 Senior Firefighter Edward "Dinosaur" Spence ~ Max Phipps

Season Two
Senior Station Officer Quentin "Spit" Jacobsen ~ Wayne Pygram
Station Officer Montgomery "Seldom" Webber ~ Damian Pike
Firefighter John "Repo" Kennedy ~ Andy Anderson
Firefighter Louis "Grievous" Fazio ~ Tayler Kane
Firefighter Danny "Nugget" Hunt ~ Danny Adcock
Firefighter Marilyn "Tex" Perez ~ Tottie Goldsmith
Firefighter Greta "Garbo" Fazio ~ Fiona MacGregor
Firefighter Peter "TNT" Thompson ~ Robert Morgan
Firefighter Martin "Mary" Hawthorne ~ Damian Rice

Recurring Characters
Dolores Kennedy ~ Deborra-Lee Furness
Detective Sergeant Jean Diamond ~ Liddy Clark
Det. Sen. Sgt. Ron Chandler ~ John Heywood
Det. Henri Aldridge ~ Andrew McKaige
Det. Vlad Hadzic ~ Wayne Cull
Al ~ Norman Steiner
Dr. David Crown ~ Sean Scully
Ted Cartwright ~ Daniel Roberts
Anne Risdale ~ Anne Tenney
Sophie Harrison ~ Genevieve Picot
Jimmy Runyon ~ Kym Gyngell
Dr. Pru Eberhardt ~ Angela Punch McGregor

Season synopsis

Season 1
The series starts with new female recruit Morgan Cartwright (Georgie Parker) joining the ranks of South East Fire station in Brisbane. Morgan has to face prejudices in the male dominated profession, mainly from the icy platoon sergeant "Spit". Other characters include The Boss (Peter Phelps), Grievous, Banjo (Aaron Jeffrey), Dinosaur, Repo (Andy Anderson) and Giraffe.

The local arson squad also play a very prominent part from the beginning of season 1. Detective Sergeant Jean Diamond (Liddy Clark) has been investigating a series of fires for over a year, which she believes to actually be the work of a firefighter. Knowing that Morgan has just joined South East, Jean approaches Morgan and puts her theory to her. She asks that Morgan will be her "eyes and ears" in the fire station. This makes life complicated for Morgan.

Ultimately, Detective Diamond's theory is proved correct. It is revealed that one of the firefighters from South East has been lighting fires.

Season 1 was made with the cooperation of the Queensland Fire Service and their appliances were used during filming as well as their logos. The two main appliances used at South East were an International ACCO Teleboom and a Firepac appliance.

Season 2
Season 2 was centred on a different fire station. However, three fire fighters from the original series, Repo, Grievous and Spit, were retained and joined by new characters at West End fire station. After the death of Repo's father, he decides to apply for the rank of Station Officer at West End.  He gains the promotion much to the disgust of Spit, the Senior Station Officer. After some events that take place at fire scenes, Repo decides that he would be happier just being a firefighter. He steps down from the position of Station Officer and this vacancy is taken by Seldom, who has recently passed his tests.

Meanwhile, Tex finds out that she is pregnant and is confused as to what to do. She talks to Repo's wife, Dolores and her doctor and decides to terminate.

The station is a mix of various characters. Grievous is the womaniser who loves to fight fires and finds out that he has a son from the turkey baster incident in season 1. Nugget is the veteran who just likes to get on with the job.  Mary, the Army wannabe loves regiment and discipline and looks up to Spit. TNT is the union rep at the station who seems to always look on the negative side of everything (hence the nickname "Totally Negative Tommo").

Seldom gets himself into disciplinary trouble with Spit, when his vendetta against Jimmy Runyon (Kym Gyngell) becomes far more than job related. After TNT makes some disparaging remarks towards the Commissioner he finds himself transferred to the bush. His replacement is Greta Fazio who just happens to be Grievous' cousin. She is a bit of a daredevil (earning herself the nickname "Garbo") and takes a little while to settle in. She becomes involved in a sexual harassment case with Nugget, which ultimately ends in tragedy.

Season 2 was made without the support of the Queensland Fire Service. The made up name of Queensland Fire Brigade was used during this season with a different logo. Appliances used were purchased/loaned to make the show. The two main appliances used at West End were an International ACCO Pumper and a RFW Wormald Simon Snorkel appliance. The withdrawal of support by the Queensland Fire Service was the result of concerns raised by the United Firefighters Union and Fire Service management about the way firefighters and the fire service were portrayed in the first season.

Unlike Season 1, which featured 13 episodes, Season 2 only had six episodes, although Episode 5, "Vendetta", was divided into five parts, and episode 6, "War of the Worlds", into four, giving the season a total of 13 separate "episodes".

List of episodes

Episode information retrieved from Australian Television archive.

Season 1 (1995)

Season 2 (1996)

Home media 

Both Season 1 and 2 were released on DVD as separate Box Sets by Beyond DVD/Force Entertainment in Australia.

External links 
 
Fire at the National Film and Sound Archive

References

Australian drama television series
Seven Network original programming
Television shows set in Queensland
1995 Australian television series debuts
1996 Australian television series endings
Television series by Beyond Television Productions